The 2nd/4th Battalion Royal Australian Regiment (2/4 RAR) was an Australian Army infantry battalion. 2/4 RAR was formed on 15 August 1973 by linking 2nd Battalion, Royal Australian Regiment and 4th Battalion, Royal Australian Regiment. 2/4 RAR was unlinked to re-form 2 RAR and 4 RAR on 1 February 1995. Throughout its existence 2/4 RAR was based at Lavarack Barracks in Townsville and formed part of the 3rd Brigade.

Elements of 2/4 RAR served in Malaysia as Rifle Company Butterworth from 1975 until 1989, Cambodia in 1993 and Rwanda in 1994. In addition, 53 personnel were attached to 1 RAR during Operation Solace which saw a battalion group based around 1 RAR deploy to Somalia in 1993.

Alliances
2/4 RAR maintained the following alliances:
 Coldstream Regiment of Foot Guards
 Irish Regiment of Foot Guards

Further reading

External links
 2/4 RAR Association of Australia

2 4
Military units and formations established in 1973
Military units and formations disestablished in 1995
Military units involved in UN peacekeeping missions